Jankulovski is a Macedonian surname. Notable people with the surname include:

Dime Jankulovski (born 1977), Swedish footballer of Macedonian descent
Marek Jankulovski (born 1977), Czech footballer of Macedonian descent

Macedonian-language surnames